Holcosus niceforoi is a species of lizard in the family Teiidae. The species is endemic to Colombia.

References

niceforoi
Reptiles described in 1943
Taxa named by Emmett Reid Dunn